Chidi Anselm Odinkalu born (June 12, 1968) is a Nigerian human rights activist, lawyer, professor and writer. He was the former Chairman of Nigeria's National Human Rights Commission (Nigeria) and was recently the senior team manager for the Africa Program of Open Society Justice Initiative. 

He has worked as an advisor for the Ford Foundation New York, World Bank, African Union, International Council for Human Rights Policy, Geneva; and many others. August 2021, the Fletcher School of Law and Diplomacy at Tufts University appointed Odinkalu a Professor in Human Rights Law.

In 2018, he co-authored a book titled Too Good to Die with Ayisha Osori.

Early life
Odinkalu was born in Ihiala, Anambra State to two teachers: Augustine Chukwuma Odinkalu and Anthonia Ihunna Odinkalu. He hails from Orlu, Imo State.

Education
Odinkalu obtained his law degree (LLB) at Imo State University in 1987 and was called to the bar in 1988. He emerged as the best graduating student of the School of Legal Studies, Imo State University in 1987 and won the Chief FRA Williams prize for best student in Legal Drafting and Conveyancing in 1988. He obtained a master's degree in law at the University of Lagos in 1990 and holds a Ph.D in law from the London School of Economics and Political Science. Odinkalu is a visiting professor at Harvard Law School.

Activism and career
He was the former Chairman of National Human Rights Commission (Nigeria) and currently the senior legal officer for Africa, Open Society Justice Initiative. He became the assistant lecturer at the Faculty of Law, University of Ibadan between 1988 and 1989 and worked with the Civil Liberties Organization as director of projects and planning. During the June 12, 1993 Presidential election in Nigeria, there was intense pressure on human right activists including him based on the role he played at this moment. He left Nigeria to United Kingdom, where he became the legal officer for Africa, INTERIGHTS between July 1998 and February 2003. In 1998, United Nations Observer Mission in Sierra Leone appointed him as a Human Rights Advisor. In February 2003, Odinkalu was appointed as the senior legal officer for Africa for Open Society Justice Initiative (OSJI).

Awards
In 1991, Odinkalu won the USIA Fellowship on the Bicentennial of the Bill of Rights.

Publications
Building Bridges for Rights: Inter-Africa Initiatives in the Field of Human Rights 2001 (Co-Author). Justice Denied; Areas Courts in the Northern States of Nigeria 1992. Behind the Wall: Prison Conditions in Nigeria and the Nigerian Prison System 1991 (Co-Author).

Books
Too Good to Die: Third Term and the Myth of the Indispensable Man in Africa (coauthor).

References

Nigerian philosophers
Nigerian human rights activists
1968 births
Living people
English-language writers from Nigeria
Nigerian humanists
Imo State University alumni
Political philosophers
Academic staff of the University of Ibadan
21st-century Nigerian writers